ʿAyn al Ghazaya is a village in Nalut District in northwestern Libya. It lies on a crossroads on the Wazzin–Nalut road on the northern edge of the Tripolitanian Plateau in the Nafusa Mountains.

History
ʿAyn al Ghazaya was a Gaddafi stronghold during the 2011 Libyan civil war, and provided a base for loyalist troops in the 2011 Nafusa Mountains Campaign. After the some 5,000 inhabitants were removed to Tripoli, it was captured by the rebel forces on 29 July 2011.

Notes

External links
 "ʿAyn al Ghazaya Map — Satellite Images of 'Ayn al Ghazaya" Maplandia World Gazetteer

Populated places in Nalut District